Selwyn House School (SHS) is an English-language  independent K-11 boys' school located in Westmount, Quebec. The school was founded in 1908 by Englishman Captain Algernon Lucas and was named in honour of Selwyn College at the University of Cambridge, which Lucas attended. The school body currently numbers 550 students with an average class size of 15 to 20 students.

Students are divided into four houses, which serve intramural athletics purposes within the primary school. The houses, named after the first four headmasters of the school, are Lucas (yellow), Macaulay (red), Wanstall (green) and Speirs (blue). The Selwyn House Gryphons have fielded strong athletic teams in recent decades and their traditional rivals in sports are Lower Canada College and Loyola High School. The school remains one of only three all-male educational institutions left in Quebec. They host co-ed events with sister schools Miss Edgar's and Miss Cramp's School and The Study.

Despite charging among the highest tuition fees for a private day school in Quebec, Selwyn House also previously took grants from the provincial government which is available to all private schools for Grade 7 to 11. All students in the secondary school section were therefore required to have a certificate of eligibility allowing them to attend government-funded English schools in Quebec. Prior to 2021, students without the certificate could only attend the non-subsidized primary section from Kindergarten to Grade 6, and must have received the required certificate by the end of Grade 6 in order to continue attending the school. Since 2021, Selwyn House no longer receives any government subsidies and students no longer need the certificate for any grade. By foregoing subsidies, the school is now able to broaden its potential student pool and admit the wealthiest students from French elementary schools who were previously barred from attending Selwyn House’s secondary school due to Bill 101.

History
In 1908, the English-speaking elite of Montreal were in need of a suitable preparatory school, and British Captain Algernon Lucas was seeking a teaching career in Canada. A graduate of Selwyn College, Cambridge University, he was given the job of educating seven boys. Within two years, the school had to move from Lucas' Crescent Street apartment to a larger house on Mackay Street. In 1912, Lucas turned to the business world and Colin Macaulay, who had been a classmate of Lucas at Selwyn College, replaced him as headmaster.

Selwyn House quickly grew in size and relocated two more times. Its aim was to provide a solid grounding in basic subjects, and to equip boys for the boarding schools from which they would proceed to university. The school was modeled after English preparatory schools, and the staff was largely recruited from the United Kingdom. Under the leadership of Dr. Robert Speirs, headmaster from 1945 to 1971 and after whom the Speirs Medal is named, the reputation of the school grew significantly. In the 1940s, the students who attended the school were overwhelmingly Protestant with the notable exception of sons of the Bronfman family, who were Jewish.

The school moved to its present location in 1961, having bought the property from Westmount High School.

In 1985, William Mitchell became the headmaster. The school's needs and demands for added facilities reached a point where one building was no longer sufficient. When St. Andrew's United Church across the street closed, Selwyn House purchased and renovated it, and it is now known as the Macaulay Building. In 1999, the school underwent substantial renovations in its three main buildings on campus. In 2002, the school built the Speirs Building which housed a new double-sized gym, a spacious high-tech library, numerous classrooms, offices and an agora for student assemblies and various other functions. This was followed by a massive renovation of the original Lucas Building, including converting its gymnasium into a large, modern dining hall and fully equipped auditorium, dubbed Coristine Hall.

Jonathan Kay, who attended the school in the 1980s, describes the student body as being predominantly white and anglophone when he was a student there with only three students of Asian descent in his grade. He also mentions the constant racial bullying of his French Canadian classmate and notes that it was more difficult back then to be a francophone than a Jewish or visible minority student. French has gradually been introduced to the school curriculum, and since 1999, elementary school students now spend 80 percent of the time learning in French from Kindergarten to Grade 2, and 50 percent from Grade 3 to 6. According to Kay, the school no longer resembles the one he attended and is now fully bilingual and racially diverse.

In January 2009, Hal Hannaford took over as the school's new headmaster after having previously served as the longtime headmaster of Royal St. George's College in Toronto. In Winter 2010, Selwyn House completed renovations of the aging Macaulay Building.

In June 2020, Hannaford retired and was replaced by Mike Downey, who previously served as a teacher, a coach and most recently, the head of senior school at Selwyn House.

Controversies
In September 2005, an alumnus of the school launched a lawsuit against Selwyn House claiming that he had been molested by a former teacher. Allegations regarding misconduct had been made in 1971, 1983, and again in 1991 when the school administration confronted the teacher. Soon after, the teacher killed his elderly father and then committed suicide. As a result, no further action on the issue was taken by the school administration.

Allegations that two other former teachers, including John Aimers, had also abused students were filed as part of a class action lawsuit on February 3, 2006. The school agreed to a $5 million compensation fund in January 2009. The fund was approved by the Quebec Superior Court as a settlement for former students, their partners, and their parents. The allegations claimed that various teachers, none of whom were still present at the school, committed sexual abuse of over 30 minors during the 1970s to early 1980s.

Charity and fundraising
Selwyn House participates yearly in the Terry Fox Run, Shave to Save and Movember.

The Veritas Fund is a charitable organization established by the school to provide bursaries. The value of the fund has grown from $3.1 million in 2004 to $17.5 million in 2019 and contributions come from alumni donations and others connected to the school. Income generated from long term investments owned by the fund is then used to pay for scholarships and financial assistance for students who qualify.

The school also donates a portion of their fundraising proceeds to charity. A gala hosted in 2008 to celebrate Selwyn House’s centennial anniversary raised $1.5 million with 10 percent of the money going to local charities. A similar event in 2013 raised $1.4 million with a portion going to charity as well.

Notable people

Selwyn House has traditionally been the school of choice for Montreal’s Anglophone elite. Sons of the Molson family have attended the school during every decade of Selwyn House's existence. Many members of the Bronfman family have also attended the school. Ten former students of Selwyn House have been awarded Rhodes Scholarships.

Mentions in popular culture 
The movie Prom Wars is based on Selwyn House. In the movie, Selby House battle Lancaster College (allegories for Selwyn House and Lower Canada College, respectively, historically "arch-rival" schools) over the right to take ACS (ECS) girls, the nearby girls school, to their respective proms.
The school has been mentioned in Mordecai Richler's novel, Barney's Version.
The school is part of the basis for Richler's Jacob Two-Two adventure series.  Richler's son Jacob was a student at Selwyn House.

Footnotes

External links
Selwyn House School

English-language schools in Quebec
Elementary schools in Montreal
High schools in Montreal
Private schools in Quebec
Schools in Westmount, Quebec
Boys' schools in Canada